Joseph Smeets (born 11 August 1959) is a Belgian former cyclist. He competed at the 1980 Summer Olympics and 1984 Summer Olympics.

References

External links
 

1959 births
Living people
Belgian male cyclists
Olympic cyclists of Belgium
Cyclists at the 1980 Summer Olympics
Cyclists at the 1984 Summer Olympics
Sportspeople from Liège
Cyclists from Liège Province